Family Tree is the fifth studio album by Danish singer and songwriter Oh Land. It was released by Tusk or Tooth Records on 3 May 2019. "Human Error" was released as the album's lead single on 4 January 2019. "Brief Moment", the album's second single, was distributed to online music retailers on 22 February 2019. A remix of "Salt" produced by Arthur Moon was released to streaming services in a single format on 4 September 2019.

Track listing

Charts

Release history

References 

2019 albums
Oh Land albums